Jaissle is a surname. Notable people with the surname include:

Matthias Jaissle (born 1988), German footballer and manager

German-language surnames